A sin-eater is a person who consumes a ritual meal in order to spiritually take on the sins of a deceased person. The food was believed to absorb the sins of a recently dead person, thus absolving the soul of the person. Sin-eaters, as a consequence, carried the sins of all people whose sins they had eaten; they were usually feared and shunned.

Cultural anthropologists and folklorists classify sin-eating as a form of ritual. It is most commonly associated with Wales, English counties bordering Wales and Welsh culture.

Attestations

History
While there have been analogous instances of sin-eaters throughout history, the questions of how common the practice was, when it was  practiced, and what the interactions between sin-eaters, common people, and religious authorities were remain largely unstudied by folklore academics.

In Meso-American civilization, Tlazolteotl, the Aztec goddess of vice, purification, steam baths, lust and filth, and a patroness of adulterers (her name literally means 'Sacred Filth'), had a redemptive role in religious practices. At the end of an individual's life, they were allowed to confess misdeeds to this deity, and according to legend she would cleanse the soul by "eating its filth".

In wider Christian practice, Jesus of Nazareth has been interpreted as a universal archetype for sin-eaters, offering his life to atone or purify all of humanity of their sins.

The 1911 Encyclopædia Britannica states in its article on "sin eaters":

In Wales and the Welsh Marches
The term "Sin-eater" appears to derive from Welsh culture and is most often associated with Wales itself and in the English counties bordering Wales.

Seventeenth-century diarist John Aubrey, in the earliest source on the practice, wrote that "an old Custome" in Herefordshire had been

John Bagford (ca.1650–1716) includes the following description of the sin-eating ritual in his Letter on Leland's Collectanea, i. 76. (as cited in Brewer's Dictionary of Phrase and Fable, 1898)

By 1838, Catherine Sinclair noted the practice was in decline but that it continued in the locality:

A local legend in Shropshire, England, concerns the grave of Richard Munslow, who died in 1906, said to be the last sin-eater of the area. Unusually, Munslow was not poor or an outcast, instead being a wealthy farmer from an established family. Munslow may have revived the custom after the deaths of three of his children in a week 1870 due to scarlet fever. In the words of local Reverend Norman Morris of Ratlinghope, "It was a very odd practice and would not have been approved of by the church but I suspect the vicar often turned a blind eye to the practice." At the funeral of anyone who had died without confessing their sins, a sin-eater would take on the sins of the deceased by eating a loaf of bread and drinking ale out of a wooden bowl passed over the coffin, and make a short speech:

The 1926 book Funeral Customs by Bertram S. Puckle mentions the sin-eater:

In popular culture

William Sharp, writing as Fiona Macleod, published a weird tale entitled "The Sin Eater" in 1895.

"The Sins of the Fathers", a 1972 episode of the American television series Night Gallery, features Richard Thomas as a sin-eater in medieval Wales.

Published in 1977 by Duckworth Books, The Sin Eater was the first of British writer Alice Thomas Ellis's many novels. It "exposed the hidden rancours of Irish, Welsh and English," in the words of journalist and writer Clare Colvin. Writing for the Los Angeles Review of Books, Abby Geni comments, "The story orbits around the Captain, a failing patriarch, and the family who have gathered at his bedside. There are no ghosts or disembodied voices here. Instead, lovely Rose organizes meals and cricket matches. Angela, visiting from out of town, vies with Rose for control of the proceedings. Awkward Ermyn searches for her place in the group. Servants lurk on the sidelines. The story is ripe with shadows and terror. An unclassifiable menace seeps through the book like a fog."

The 1978 TV miniseries The Dark Secret of Harvest Home features a funeral scene wherein all the mourners in attendance avert their faces as a repudiated fellow designated the sin-eater dines upon a symbolic meal, which includes a coin pressed into a cheese, thereby taking the deceased's transgressions in life upon himself.

Sin-Eater is the name of a Marvel Comics villain.

Margaret Atwood wrote a short story titled "The Sin-Eater". It was dramatised by the Canadian Broadcasting Corporation in their radio series Anthology in 1981.

The 2003 movie The Order is a fictional horror story revolving around the investigation of the suspicious death of an excommunicated priest and the discovery of a Sin Eater headquartered in Rome.

The 2004 movie The Final Cut is set in a world where memories are recorded, and then "cut" into positive hagiographies on the person's death; the "cutters" are referred to as sin-eaters.

The 2007 film The Last Sin Eater tells the story of a community of Welsh immigrants in Appalachia, 1850.  The sin eater of the community is seen through the eyes of ten-year-old Cadi Forbes.

In the film The Bourne Legacy (2012), a central character who leads a US government black ops program describes himself and his team as "sin eaters", doing the "morally indefensible" but absolutely necessary thing, "so that the rest of our cause can stay pure."

The American TV show Sleepy Hollow used the term Sin-Eater as the title of Season 1, episode 6, as a way to introduce another character on the show that is a sin-eater.
 
The American TV show Lucifer used the term Sin-Eater as the title of season 2, episode 3, to refer to the content moderation employees of a fictional social media company. The American TV show Arrow did so too in the season 5, episode 14, referring to a flash-back story of Anatoli Knyazev telling Oliver Queen he acts as a sin-eater.

In the American TV show Succession, Gerri, Waystar Royco's general counsel, suggests to Tom Wambsgans that he become the family sin-eater and destroy evidence of illegal activities aboard the company's cruise lines, "Have you ever heard of the sin cake eater? He would come to the funeral and he would eat all the little cakes they’d lay out on the corpse. He ate up all the sins. And you know what? The sin cake eater was very well paid. And so long as there was another one who came along after he died, it all worked out. So this might not be the best situation, but there are harder jobs and you get to eat an amazing amount of cake."

The White Wolf publishing company's role-playing game Geist: The Sin-Eaters is named for the concept, though it never directly references the actual ritual practice.

The comic series Finder features a main character who is a sin-eater, and thus despised by his mother's culture as the lowest member of their society.

In the MMORPG Final Fantasy XIV: Shadowbringers, sin eaters are recurring hostile entities that aim to devour all living beings in The First, mindless monsters driven by insatiable hunger for living aether. The stronger sin-eaters are capable of "forgiving" the creatures they attack, gruesomely and permanently mutating them into newborn sin eaters. Most of these creatures tend to be named as "forgiven" sins (Forgiven Cowardice, Forgiven Cruelty, Forgiven Hypocrisy, etc.). The strongest sin eaters are known as Lightwardens.

In A Breath of Snow and Ashes, the sixth book in the Outlander series of novels by Diana Gabaldon, Roger Wakefield presides over the funeral of Hiram Crombie's mother-in-law, Mrs. Wilson, where a sin-eater makes an appearance.

The Sin Eater's Daughter is a YA fantasy novel written by Melinda Salisbury which includes a version of the practice and was published on February 24, 2015.

References

External links
 Online Book: Funeral Customs by Bertram S. Puckle at Sacred-Texts.com
 The Weird but True History of Sin Eaters
 "Sins of the Father", Night Gallery episode based on sin-eating

Folklore
Religious food and drink
Funeral food and drink
Traditional religious occupations